The 1981 NCAA Division II basketball tournament involved 32 schools playing in a single-elimination tournament to determine the national champion of men's NCAA Division II college basketball as a culmination of the 1980–81 NCAA Division II men's basketball season. It was won by Florida Southern College and Florida Southern's John Ebeling was the Most Outstanding Player.

Regional participants

*denotes tie

Regionals

South Atlantic - Emmitsburg, Maryland
Location: Memorial Gym Host: Mount Saint Mary's College and Seminary

Third Place - Cheyney 76, Randolph-Macon 67

Great Lakes - Macomb, Illinois
Location: Western Hall Host: Western Illinois University

Third Place - Wright State 96, Indiana State–Evansville 89

North Central - Green Bay, Wisconsin
Location: Brown County Veterans Memorial Arena Host: University of Wisconsin at Green Bay

Third Place - North Dakota State 95, Central Missouri State 87

South Central - Florence, Alabama
Location: Flowers Hall Host: University of North Alabama

Third Place - Jacksonville State 84, Lincoln 66

West - Billings, Montana
Location: Alterowitz Gym Host: Eastern Montana College

Third Place - Eastern Montana 54, Chico State 49

South - Orlando, Florida
Location: UCF Fieldhouse Host: University of Central Florida

Third Place - West Georgia 102, Morehouse 76

East - West Long Branch, New Jersey
Location: William T. Boylan Gymnasium Host: Monmouth College

Third Place - Monmouth 79, Bloomsburg 64

New England - Manchester, New Hampshire
Location: NHC Fieldhouse Host: New Hampshire College

Third Place - Stonehill 79, Springfield 78

*denotes each overtime played

National Quarterfinals

National Finals - Springfield, Massachusetts
Location: Springfield Civic Center Hosts: American International College and Springfield College

Third Place - Cal Poly 62, Green Bay 61**

*denotes each overtime played

All-tournament team
 Jay Bruchak (Mount Saint Mary's)
 John Ebeling (Florida Southern)
 Mike Hayes (Florida Southern)
 Durelle Lewis (Mount Saint Mary's)
 Jim Rowe (Mount Saint Mary's)

See also
1981 NCAA Division I basketball tournament
1981 NCAA Division III basketball tournament
1981 NAIA men's basketball tournament

References

Sources
 2010 NCAA Men's Basketball Championship Tournament Records and Statistics: Division II men's basketball Championship
 1981 NCAA Division II men's basketball tournament jonfmorse.com

NCAA Division II men's basketball tournament
Tournament
NCAA Division II basketball tournament
NCAA Division II basketball tournament